Mullany is a surname. Notable people with the surname include:

 James Robert Madison Mullany (1818-1887), US Navy rear admiral
 John Mullany, an Australian politician in the 1910s and '20s
 Kate Mullany (1845-1906), early American female labor leader
 Mitch Mullany (1968-2008), American comedian, actor and screenwriter
 Patrick Mullany, former FBI instructor and agent who co-pioneered offender profiling
 Peter Mullany, a guitarist for Johnny Dole & The Scabs, one of the first Australian punk rock bands
 Antigua honeymoon murders of newlyweds Ben (1977–2008) and Catherine Mullany (1977–2008)
 Patrick Francis Mullany, known as Brother Azarias, Irish-American essayist

See also
 Mullaney